Terry Reid is the eponymous second studio album by Terry Reid, recorded in 1969 (U.S. reissue title Move Over for Terry Reid). The album spent five weeks on the US Billboard Top LPs chart, hitting its peak position at No. 147 on November 8, 1969.

The ninth track, "Rich Kid Blues", was the eponymous song on an album released by Marianne Faithfull, produced by Mike Leander in 1971 but unreleased for 14 years until 1985.

Track listing
All tracks by Terry Reid except where indicated
 "Superlungs My Supergirl" (Donovan Leitch) – 4:17
 "Silver White Light" – 2:51
 "July" – 2:28
 "Marking Time"  – 3:45
 "Stay with Me Baby" (George David Weiss, Jerry Ragovoy) – 4:10
 "Highway 61 Revisited" (Bob Dylan) / "Friends" (Reid) – 7.58
 "May Fly" – 3:41
 "Speak Now or Forever Hold Your Peace" – 4:24
 "Rich Kid Blues" – 4:15

Track 5 incorrectly attributed to "Simmonds-Youlden-Peverett" (Savoy Brown song of the same name) on the record label.

Personnel

Musicians
 Terry Reid – vocals, guitar
 Peter Shelley – keyboards
 Keith Webb – drums

Technical
 Mickie Most – producer
 Martin Birch – engineer

References

External links

1969 albums
Terry Reid albums
albums produced by Mickie Most